Konaipalle is a village in the siddipet district of Telangana, India. It falls under the Nangnur mandal. It is located 12.5 km distance from its constituency Siddipet. Konaipalle comes under Medak district before formation of new districts in telangana. Presently konaipalle belongs to siddipet district.  The famous Lord Venkateshwara temple located here. Kalvakuntla chandrasheker rao usually offer prayers before every nomination from his first elections since 1985. It became a tradition for him. Thaneeru Harish Rao also do the same. The temple was constructed in 1980s by the devotees. The present temple was a renovated one during 2020s with a cost of 3.5 crores. Usually in the february, 3 days fair will be conducted by devotees. On the very first day, Lord venkateshwara swamy kalyanam will be conducted, On second and third day, Annadanam(Food donation), Edla uregimpu (Bullock cart parade) will be conducted respectively.

References

Siddipet district